BBC News Ukrainian is the Ukrainian service of BBC News which conveys the latest political, social, economical and sport news relevant to Ukraine and the world. It started broadcasts in 1992. Its headquarters are in London, United Kingdom. The first BBC Ukrainian program was aired on 1 June 1992. It featured President of Ukraine Leonid Kravchuk and UK Prime Minister John Major. It has had an office in Kyiv since 1993 with around ten staff, in 1993 the office was manned by one correspondent. BBC Ukrainian has a few dozen reporters - both in Ukraine and abroad.

From June 2009 BBC Ukrainian aired hourly news broadcasts outside its morning and evening broadcasts. Radio broadcasts ceased on 29 April 2011, leaving only Internet publication.

Programs 

"Morning with the BBC" and "Good evening from London" were two the most popular programmes broadcast directly from the British capital and from Kyiv, the latter was interactive. On Fridays BBC editors invited guests, well known people in Ukraine, who were specialists in various fields: politicians, analysts, scientists etc.
"Morning with the BBC" started at 6 a.m. Kyiv time on weekdays and was broadcast for one hour by Radio Era and other partner stations. It was on air on ultra-short waves in Kharkiv and Kyiv regions.

In 2022, following Russia's invasion the BBC launched a 30 minute daily TV news bulletin. On the first week of the Russia invasion, BBC News Ukraine reached a record 5.6 million people across the website bbc.ua and social platforms. Over the following two months, the service has maintained a weekly digital audience that is more than double its average for previous years.

BBC Ukraine staff 

 Olha Burda, has started her career as a teacher, she has worked in Donetsk Oblast. She has worked at the leading Ukrainian newspapers and TV channels, and then she became a radio journalist.
 Oleksandr Bondarenko, has a Diploma in Ukrainian philology, graduate of Luhansk Pedagogical University, worked at several Ukrainian TV channels.
 Svitlana Dorosh, is the chief correspondent of BBC-Kyiv office, obtained a degree in journalism at the Taras Shevchenko National University of Kyiv, she worked in the editors offices of Kyiv newspapers, information agencies and radio stations.
 Anastasiia Zanuda is an economist, graduated from Kyiv Institute of National Economy, yet had worked as a translator, and then mastered journalist's skills.
 Oles Konoshevych  is an international lawyer, graduated from the International Relations Department, Kyiv National University
 Lubomyr Krupnytskyy is a historian by qualification, graduated from Ternopil Pedagogical University. Yet, has a very vast professional experience as a journalist. Before joining the BBC service he worked as a correspondent for a number of well-known Ukrainian newspapers.
 Svitlana Pyrkalo, is the producer of the Ukrainian Service, writer, journalist
 Roman Lebed was the youngest journalist at BBC-Ukraine, graduated from Lviv State University, before joining BBC he had worked at the local radio in Rivne
 Olha Makarchuk, has a degree of translator of English and German languages. She worked on television and radio, was correspondent for BBC Ukrainian Service in Germany
 Marta Shokalo, is a graduate of University of Kyiv-Mohyla Academy, with a degree in Philosophy, worked at BBC-Ukraine as a journalist
 Olha Malchevska is a producer and presenter.  Before working for the BBC, she was also a Vaclav Havel fellow.

References

External links 
 

Ukrainian
Radio stations in Ukraine
Ukraine–United Kingdom relations
Ukrainian-language radio stations
Radio stations established in 1992